Robert Lonsdale (born 2 November 1983) is an English actor and musician.

Early life and education
Son of Tom and Dilys Lonsdale, he was born on 2 November 1983 in Marsden, West Yorkshire, and has one sister. He went to the Academy of Live and Recorded Arts. He won the Carlton Hobbs Bursary and was once described by Tim Rice as "a young man with enormous talent".

Career
Lonsdale first started acting at the age of eight. One of his first television acting roles was on Coronation Street in 2002.
He has appeared on television and on stage in various roles. He has also done work on radio plays for the BBC, including All Quiet on the Western Front, Henry VIII, The Steps, Walter Now, Pilgrim, The Time Machine (on BBC Radio 3 in 2009), The Pattern of Painful Adventures (2008), On the Beach (November 2008 for Radio 4) and The Tenant of Wildfell Hall (BBC).

Lonsdale has appeared on stage in Brilliant Adventures as Luke at The Royal Court, A Life at the Finborough Theatre, and Anna Christie (alongside Jude Law and Ruth Wilson) at the Donmar Warehouse. He's also acted in La Bete (on West End/Broadway), The Indian Wants The Bronx at the Young Vic and Made in Dagenham.

In 2013, he won Best Studio Performance in Brilliant Adventures at Royal Exchange Studio for the Manchester Theatre Awards.

In 2014, Lonsdale played the lead role of Private Prewitt, the American GI in From Here to Eternity the Musical and sang several numbers in the show. This was his first musical. He released one of the number from the show, “Fight the Fight”, as a single. He was nominated for a Whatsonstage Award for Best Actor. Following From Here to Eternity he played Daniel in Another Place at The Drum, Theatre Royal, Plymouth. and one of the leading roles in the BBC's The Interceptor. 

From 2015 to 2017, Lonsdale played a series regular in Chewing Gum as Connor, Tracey's (Michaela Coel) love interest and a poet.

In 2017, Lonsdale was in A Lie of the Mind at Southwark Playhouse with Gethin Anthony and Kate Fahy. The following year, he performed in the play Utility at the Orange Tree Theatre in Richmond. He appeared in the musical Standing at the Sky's Edge at the Crucible Theatre in Sheffield in 2019 and The National Theatre in 2023. 

He plays the guitar, the ukulele, the bugle and a bit of piano and writes his own music.

Personal life
Lonsdale ran the London Marathon in 2018 on behalf of Heads Together charity, which encourages people to speak openly about mental health. He lives in South East London and supports Tottenham Hotspur.

Filmography

Film

Television

References

External links
 
 
 TV appearance on This Morning singing with Darius Campbell

1983 births
21st-century English male actors
Alumni of the Academy of Live and Recorded Arts
English male film actors
English male stage actors
English male television actors
Living people
Male actors from Yorkshire
People from Marsden, West Yorkshire
Male actors from Huddersfield